Aeroflot Flight 331 was an international passenger flight operated by an Ilyushin Il-62M that crashed about  from José Martí International Airport, in Havana, Cuba, on 27 May 1977. The accident occurred after the aircraft hit power lines on its final approach to the airport during poor weather. The aircraft was attempting an emergency landing due to a fire in one of its engines. Only two of the 70 occupants on board survived. The cause of the crash was ruled to be pilot error.

Aircraft 
The aircraft involved was an Ilyushin Il-62M, registered as CCCP-86614 and operated by the International Civil Aviation Directorate of Aeroflot. At the time of the accident, the aircraft had 5,549 hours of flight and 1,144 use cycles. The aircraft was delivered to Aeroflot in 1975.

Passengers and crew 
At a stopover in Lisbon, Portugal, a new crew took command of the aircraft. The five-man crew consisted of Captain Viktor Orlov, Co-pilot Vasily Shevelev, Navigator Anatoly Vorobyov, Flight Engineer Yuri Suslov, and Radio Operator Evgeniy Pankov. Five flight attendants were on the aircraft.

Sequence of events 
While on approach to Havana, the crew reported seeing false altitude and air pressure readings. The damage caused the aircraft to making a sharp 70° bank to the right over the next three seconds. The aircraft then struck the ground with its right wing and nose and caught fire, destroying it. Only the tail section remained.

The only two survivors of the crash were a West German woman and a Soviet man. One of the victims was José Carlos Schwarz, a poet and musician from Guinea-Bissau.

Investigation 
An investigation revealed serious errors made by the crew in the last moments of the flight. The main cause of the accident was a blatant violation of approach procedure, errors in calculating altitude that resulted in incorrect altitude readings that led to a premature descent, and the crew's attempt at a visual approach in dense fog. Also cited was the incorrect use of the radio altimeter by the crew.

See also 

Aeroflot accidents and incidents in the 1970s

References

Further reading

Aviation accidents and incidents in Cuba
Aviation accidents and incidents in 1977
Airliner accidents and incidents involving controlled flight into terrain
Airliner accidents and incidents caused by pilot error
1977 in Cuba
Cuba–Soviet Union relations
Accidents and incidents involving the Ilyushin Il-62
331
May 1977 events in North America